Wallace Prescott Rowe (February 20, 1926, Baltimore – July 4, 1983, Baltimore) was an American virologist, known for his research on retroviruses and oncoviruses and as a co-discoverer (with Robert J. Huebner and three other researchers in 1953) of adenoviruses.

Rowe graduated in 1945 with a B.S. from the College of William and Mary. In 1945 he served in the U.S. Navy. In 1948 he graduated with an M.D. from Johns Hopkins Medical School. From 1949 to 1952 he was a virologist at the Naval Medical Research Institute in Bethesda, Maryland, where he worked in Erich Traub's laboratory. From 1952 until his death in 1983 Rowe was a federal civil servant employed by the U.S. Public Health Service (USPHS) and the National Institute of Allergy and Infectious Diseases (NIAID) of the National Institutes of Health (NIH).  In 1952 he started with the tile and pay grade of assistant surgeon. He was promoted in 1956 to full surgeon and in 1968 to chief of the laboratory for NIAID. From 1960 to 1974 he taught part-time at Howard University.

Rowe and his colleagues showed that retroviruses can cause leukemia in mice. He was among the first "to recognize the role of the immune response in the pathogenesis of murine lymphocytic choriomeningitis." He was a pioneer in research on adenoviruses and their role in human diseases.

Rowe married Marjorie Louise Power (1927–2006) on 29 May 1948 in Williamsburg, Virginia. They had a son and a daughter. After divorcing his first wife, Wallace Rowe married the virologist Paula Pitha (1937–2015).

Awards and honors
 1960 — Eli Lilly and Company Award in bacteriology or immunology
 1970 — USPHS Meritorious Service Medal
 1972 — Rockefeller Public Service Award
 1974 — Howard Taylor Ricketts Award
 1975 — Membership in the National Academy of Sciences
 1976 — Selman A. Waksman Award in Microbiology
 1979 — Paul Ehrlich and Ludwig Darmstaedter Prize
 1981 — Alfred P. Sloan Jr. Prize

References

External links

1926 births
1983 deaths
20th-century American biologists
College of William & Mary alumni
Johns Hopkins School of Medicine alumni
Members of the United States National Academy of Sciences
National Institutes of Health people
Cancer researchers
American virologists
People from Baltimore